Leonidov is a Russian surname that is derived from the male given name Leonid and literally means Leonid's. It may refer to:

 Aleksei Leonidov, a nickname of Leo (Leonid) Feigin, a former BBC Russian Service disk jockey and a founder of Leo Records
 Ivan Leonidov (1902–1959), Soviet architect, urban planner, painter and teacher
 Leonid Leonidov (1873–1941), Russian and Soviet actor and stage director
 Oleh Leonidov (born 1985), Ukrainian football player

Russian-language surnames
Patronymic surnames
Surnames from given names